XHCPAF-FM is a Mexican college radio station owned by the Universidad Tecnológica de la Region Norte de Guerrero in Iguala. The station broadcasts on 103.3 MHz and is the only licensed university radio station in the state of Guerrero.

History
The UTRNG first received a radio station permit in 2013 for XHUTG-FM 98.5. The station did not come to air for another three years. However, in that time, the university also failed to transition its permit to a public use concession and thus lost the frequency. As a result, the UTRNG filed for a new public station allocation at Iguala and received XHCPAF-FM 103.3 in October 2018, beginning operations by December.

References

Radio stations in Guerrero
University radio stations in Mexico